Solomon Lewis Spink (March 20, 1831 – September 22, 1881) was an American lawyer who served as a delegate for the Dakota Territory in the United States House of Representatives.

Solomon was born in Whitehall, Washington County, New York, and was admitted to the bar in 1856, beginning practicing in Burlington, Iowa.  He moved to Paris, Illinois in 1860 and became the editor and publisher of the Prairie Beacon newspaper. Spink was a member of the Illinois state House of Representatives in 1864.

In 1865 Spink was appointed as secretary of the Dakota Territory and moved to Yankton. He served as secretary until 1869.  He was elected as a Republican to be Dakota's non-voting delegate to the U.S. Congress and served from March 4, 1869, until March 3, 1871. He was an unsuccessful candidate for reelection in 1870 and returned to Yankton to practice law.  He ran again and was again unsuccessful in 1876.  He died in Yankton and is interred in the City Cemetery there.

References

External links 

1831 births
1881 deaths
People from Whitehall, New York
Members of the Illinois House of Representatives
Delegates to the United States House of Representatives from Dakota Territory
Politicians from Burlington, Iowa
People from Paris, Illinois
People from Yankton, South Dakota
19th-century American politicians